An Area of Darkness is a book written by V. S. Naipaul in 1964. It is a travelogue detailing Naipaul's trip through India in the early sixties. It was the first of Naipaul's acclaimed Indian trilogy that includes India: A Wounded Civilization (1977) and India: A Million Mutinies Now (1990). The narration is anecdotal and descriptive.

Widely considered a passionate but pessimistic work, An Area of Darkness conveys the sense of disillusionment which the author experiences on his first visit to India in the sixties, marked with poverty and corruption. The book was banned in India for its "negative portrayal of India and its people". The book is also considered Naipaul's reckoning with his ancestral homeland and a sharp chronicle of his travels through India of the sixties encountering distressing poverty in the slums, corrupt government workers in the cities, to the ethereal beauty of the Himalayas, covering a vast canvas of the subcontinent.

According to some book reviewers, the title of the book, An Area of Darkness, was not so much a reference to India of the sixties, as to Naipaul's feelings of distress and anxiety encountering poverty and suffering in India.

References

Sources
 
 

1964 non-fiction books
British travel books
Books by V. S. Naipaul
Books about India
Censorship in the arts
Book censorship in India
Literature controversies
Censored books
André Deutsch books
Indian travel books